The Arabian short-fingered gecko or Arabian sand gecko (Trigonodactylus arabicus) is a gecko of the genus Trigonodactylus.

References

Trigonodactylus
Reptiles described in 1957